Michael McFadden (born 14 May 1936) is a Rhodesian sailor. He competed in the Finn event at the 1964 Summer Olympics.

References

External links
 

1936 births
Living people
Rhodesian male sailors (sport)
Olympic sailors of Rhodesia
Sailors at the 1964 Summer Olympics – Finn
Place of birth missing (living people)